The Angolan Handball SuperCup aka Supertaça Francisco de Almeida is an annual handball competition between the winners of the previous year's league champion and cup. In case the same team happens to win both the league and the cup, the match will be played between the league winner and the cup runner-up.

The Super Cup match marks the beginning of the handball season, followed by the league and the cup.

Angola Men's Handball SuperCup

Titles by team (Men)

Angola Women's Handball SuperCup

Titles by team (Women)

See also
 Angola Handball Cup
 Angola Men's Handball League
 Angola Women's Handball League
 Supertaça de Angola (football)
 Supertaça de Angola (basketball)
 Supertaça de Angola (roller hockey)

References

Handball competitions in Angola
2007 establishments in Angola